Amolita obliqua, the oblique grass moth, is an owlet moth in the family Erebidae. The species was first described by Smith in 1903. It is found in North America.

The MONA or Hodges number for Amolita obliqua is 9819.

References

Further reading

External links

 

Omopterini
Articles created by Qbugbot
Moths described in 1903